Cellular Physiology and Biochemistry is a scientific journal, which since 2019 is published by Cell Physiol Biochem Press, Düsseldorf, Germany.
The journal publishes articles from both the physiological and biochemical disciplines as well as related fields such as genetics, molecular biology, pathophysiology, pathobiochemistry, cellular toxicology and pharmacology.

CPB has been published by Karger Publishers until the end of 2018.

References 

Physiology journals
Molecular and cellular biology journals
Publications established in 1991
Open access journals